The Klein Meetinghouse is a historic Dunkard (Schwarzenau Brethren or Church of the Brethren) meetinghouse in Harleysville, Pennsylvania built in 1843.  The second oldest congregation of the Brethren in the United States, which was founded in the area in 1720, built the meetinghouse, and the adjoining cemetery contains the remains of Peter Becker, who led the Brethren to America in 1714.

The meetinghouse reflects the belief in simplicity held by the Brethren and similar Pietist and Anabaptist churches in early America.  The building is a single-story, wood-framed structure with a shingled roof.  Two doorways lead inside, the central doorway for the men, and the doorway for the women to the right.  The interior is just as simple and is without an altar, lectern, pulpit, candle, or stained glass.  A central post is similar to those in other Anabaptist meetinghouses of the period.  The central piece of furniture is known as the Liebsmaltisch, or Love Feast Table, used for the Lovefeast on Maundy Thursday. The historic site can be found on Maple Avenue in Harleysville, next to the Indian Valley YMCA.

See also
 National Register of Historic Places listings in Montgomery County, Pennsylvania
 Colonial Germantown Historic District – location of the first Dunkard meetinghouse in America

References

External links
 

Cemeteries in Montgomery County, Pennsylvania
Churches on the National Register of Historic Places in Pennsylvania
Churches completed in 1843
Churches in Montgomery County, Pennsylvania
Church of the Brethren
1720 establishments in Pennsylvania
Brethren church buildings
Brethren cemeteries
National Register of Historic Places in Montgomery County, Pennsylvania